The Men's sprint event of the 2017 UCI Track Cycling World Championships was held on 14 and 15 April 2017.

Results

Qualifying
The top four riders advanced directly to the 1/8 finals; places 5 to 28 advanced to the 1/16 final.

 Q = qualified directly for 1/8 finals
 q = qualified for 1/16 finals

1/16 finals
Heat winners advanced to the 1/8 finals.

1/8 finals
Heat winners advanced to the quarterfinals.

Quarterfinals
Matches were extended to a best-of-three format hereon; winners proceeded to the semifinals.

 Max Niederlag and Matthew Glaetzer were relegated "for irregular movement to prevent his opponent from passing"

Semifinals
Winners proceeded to the gold medal final; losers proceeded to the bronze medal final.

Finals
The final classification was determined in the medal finals.

References

Men's sprint
UCI Track Cycling World Championships – Men's sprint